The 2019 Nationals was the 49th Women's Nationals.  The Nationals was a team handball tournament to determine the National Champion from 2019 in the US.

Venues 
The championship was played at four courts at the Myrtle Beach Sports Center in Myrtle Beach, South Carolina.

Modus 

The eight teams are split in two pools A and B and they play a round robin.

The teams ranked third and fourth in the group were qualified for the 5-8th place crossovers.

The losers from the 5-8th crossovers played a 7th place game and the winners the 5th place game.

The best two teams per group were qualified for the semifinals.

The losers from the semis played a small final and the winners the final.

Results

Group stage

Group A

Group B

Championship

Semifinals

Small Final

Final

Consolation 5-8th Place

5-8th Place Semifinals

7th Place

5th Place

Final ranking

Statistics

Awards

Top scorers 
Source:

All-Tournament Team

References

External links 
 Tournament Results

USA Team Handball Nationals by year
Sports in Myrtle Beach, South Carolina